

Active airlines  
This is a list of actives airlines which have an air operator's certificate issued by the Civil Aviation Authority  of Peru.

See also 
List of defunct airlines of Peru
List of airports in Peru

Airlines
Peru
Airlines
Peru